Mediala bipars is a moth of the family Erebidae first described by George Hampson in 1907. It is known from Sri Lanka.

The wingspan is 12–13 mm. The hindwing is light greyish brown, darker towards termen. The terminal line is brown and the fringes are basally beige. There is an indistinct discal spot. The underside of the forewing and upper part of the hindwing are brown. Other parts of the hindwing are grey. There is a discal spot on the hindwing.

References

Micronoctuini
Moths described in 1907